The Shutov Assembly  is the thirteenth solo studio album by British musician Brian Eno, released on 10 November 1992 on Warner. One of Eno's ambient albums, it was reissued in 2014 with a second disc with bonus tracks.

Overview
The album is dedicated to Russian artist Sergei Shutov, and was created as an assembly of tracks for him, as he had mentioned to Eno the difficulty he had of getting Eno's music in the then-communist Russia.

On the rear cover of the CD, the ten tracks of nine letters are arranged in a grid as seen in a word search puzzle.
 Triennale – Milan festival where Eno had an installation in 1985.
 Alhondiga – Spanish installation in 1988.
 Markgraph – German exhibition music & light company that helps with installations.
 Lanzarote – Canary Islands, host to a yearly music festival. Originally released as "Glint (East of Woodbridge)" on flexi disc in ARTFORUM Magazine, 1986.
 Francisco – Installation at the Exploratorium in 1988.
 Riverside – Riverside Studios in London was the site of a 1986 installation.
 Innocenti – 1987 Florence installation (In Harmonic Space).
 Stedelijk – Amsterdam museum with the video installation of Mistaken Memories of Mediaeval Manhattan.
 Ikebukuro – Tokyo installation in 1989.
 Cavallino – Venice gallery with 1985 installation

The album's Rykodisc entry describes it as "a journey through Eno's sumptuous audio-visual installations from around the world, each track touching down on a particular event and atmosphere."

Track listing
"Triennale" – 4:02
"Alhondiga" – 3:16
"Markgraph" – 3:39
"Lanzarote" – 8:37
"Francisco" – 4:44
"Riverside" – 3:50
"Innocenti" – 4:19
"Stedelijk" – 5:26
"Ikebukuro" – 16:05
"Cavallino" – 3:06

 2014 reissue's bonus disc
 "Eastern Cities" – 4:32
 "Empty Platform" – 4:29
 "Big Slow Arabs" – 4:39
 "Storm" – 6:29
 "Rendition" – 5:15
 "Prague" – 2:39
 "Alhondiga Variation" – 6:33

The music
Talking to Mojo magazine in 1998, Eno explained that The Shutov Assembly tracks were originally proposals for orchestral pieces.

The Netherlands Metropole Orkest played two performances of the music in June 1999 at the Holland Festival, which ran from 5 to 26 June in Amsterdam, the first of which was broadcast live on Dutch radio.

Though the music can certainly be classified amongst his other ambient works, most of the compositions have a certain "dark" feel to them. In an interview, Eno said "it's the association with danger that I didn't use to like, and it's exactly that, what I do like now".

Credits
 Brian Eno – all instruments
 Recorded at The Wilderness Studio, Woodbridge, UK
 Mastering by Tony Cousins at the Townhouse, London
 The cover art is an image from the video painting Egypt by Eno and Greg Jakobek.

Versions

References

External links
 
 Interview with Michael Engelbrecht, October 1990
 Eno Land entry
 NPS-VPRO Supplement page (in Dutch)
 ProgArchives review 
 Starostin review (Positive)
 Beep discography entry

Brian Eno albums
1992 albums
Hannibal Records albums